Buffy novels have been published since 1998. Originally under the Pocket Books imprint of Simon & Schuster, they are now published by Simon Spotlight Entertainment which launched in 2004. Authors who have written original novels include Mel Odom, Christopher Golden, and Nancy Holder.

Chronology

Novelizations
These Buffyverse tales take place throughout the series and are novelizations of various episodes.

490 BCE-CE 1996
These Buffyverse tales take place before the television series begins (from 490 BCE to CE 1996).

Buffy Season 1

These Buffyverse tales take place around Buffy Season 1 (from spring 1996 until spring 1997).

Buffy Season 2
These tales take place during Buffy Season 2, (from autumn 1997 until spring 1998).

Buffy Season 3
These tales take place during Buffy Season 3 (from autumn 1998 until spring 1999).

Buffy Season 4/Angel Season 1
These Buffyverse tales take place during Buffy Season 4, and Angel Season 1 (from autumn 1999 until spring 2000).

Buffy Season 5/Angel Season 2
These Buffyverse tales take place during Buffy Season 5, and Angel Season 2 (from autumn 2000 until spring 2001).

Buffy Season 6/Angel Season 3
These Buffyverse tales take place around Buffy Season 6, and Angel Season 3 (from autumn 2001 until spring 2002).

Buffy Season 7 /Angel Season 4
These Buffyverse tales take place around Buffy Season 7, and Angel Season 4 (from autumn 2002 until spring 2003).

Buffy Season 8 /Angel Season 5
These Buffyverse tales take place after Buffy Season 7, and after Angel Season 4.

Canonical issues
Buffy novels are not usually considered part of Buffyverse canon by fans. However, unlike fan fiction, overviews summarising the basic story of each novel (written early in the writing process) were approved by both Fox and Joss Whedon (or his office), thereby allowing the books to be published as "official Buffy/Angel merchandise."

Novels by writer
For a list associating Buffyverse authors with their Buffyverse novels see here. List of authors who have written Buffy novels:

Pierce Askegren
Kirsten Beyer
Laura J. Burns
Denise Ciencin
Scott Ciencin
Arthur Byron Cover
Keith R. A. DeCandido
Cameron Dokey
Diana G. Gallagher
Craig Shaw Gardner
Ray Garton
Laura Anne Gilman
Christopher Golden
Christie Golden
Alice Henderson
Nancy Holder
Robert Joseph Levy
Ashley McConnell
Elizabeth Massie
Jeff Mariotte
Melinda Metz
Rebecca Moesta
Yvonne Navarro
Mel Odom
John Passarella
Paul Ruditis
Josepha Sherman
Thomas E. Sniegoski
John Vornholt

See also
 Buffy/Angel novels
 List of Buffyverse novels
 List of Angel novels
 List of television series made into books

External links
Nika Summer's Buffy Library
SlayerLit.us

Buffy The Vampire Slayer
Buffy novels
Buffy